Pathorghata is a village of Bhangura Upazila in Pabna District, Bangladesh. It is located in the southern part of Bhangura Upazila along the bank of Baral River.

Geography
The land of this village is mainly flat land with a number of depressions called beel. The middle part of this village is higher than the rest of the parts. On the north the Baral River is flowing. A nearly extinguished river 'Mara Gang' is flowing across the village.

Points of interest
Baral River bank, Pathorghata Islam o Shomaj Kalyan Gobeshona Kendro.

Administration
Pathorghata is a village under the Per Bhangura Union. It comprises a number of parts: Maddha Para, Uttar Para, Paschim Para, Chakra Para, Bishi Para, Rokon Pur and Toltoli Para.

See also
 List of villages in Bangladesh

References

Populated places in Pabna District
Villages in Pabna District
Villages in Rajshahi Division